Craig Spangenberg (18 February 1914 – 17 March 1998) was a nationally-renowned trial attorney who founded the law firm now known as Spangenberg, Shibley & Liber in Cleveland, Ohio.

Education 
Craig Spangenberg earned his undergraduate and law degrees from the University of Michigan in the 1930s.  The University of Michigan Law School awards the Craig Spangenberg Oral Advocacy Award in recognition of his trial advocacy legacy.

Craig was admitted to the Ohio bar in 1938.  In 1946 Craig Spangenberg became a founding member of the Harrison Thomas, Spangenberg and Hull law firm now known as Spangenberg, Shibley and Liber.

Legal practice 
Spangenberg specialized in personal injury litigation.  Spangenberg gained national recognition for his firm by stepping forward to represent Canadian children injured by the birth-defect-causing morning sickness medication Thalidomide.   He was appointed Canadian Queen's Counsel by Queen Elizabeth II as a result of this work.

Spangenberg served as the dean of the International Academy of Trial Lawyers in 1962.

Craig Spangenberg founded and served as the first president of the International Society of Barristers.   Established in 1965, the ISOB is an honor society of outstanding trial lawyers chosen by their peers on the basis of excellence and integrity in advocacy. The distinguished Society seeks to preserve trial by jury, the adversary system, and independence of the judiciary. With a limited membership, the Society has Fellows from every state, the District of Columbia, Puerto Rico, and the U.S. Virgin Islands, and from Australia, Canada, England, Scotland, and Mexico, with the great majority from the United States.

Family  
Craig Spangenberg was born in Yonkers, N.Y. to Albert F. Spangenberg and Beatrice (Jenkins) Spangenberg.

Craig Spangenberg married Elizabeth Jane Flansburg on 19 Nov 1937. They had two children Rhoda Ann Spangenberg b. 12 Dec 1939 and Thomas Craig Spangenberg b. 1 Jun 1942. They subsequently divorced. He married Helen J. Schnierer on 11 Dec 1947, and together they had two children: Lynne b. 12 May 1951 and Scott .  Spangenberg died in Lyndhurst, OH and is buried at the Evergreen Hill Cemetery in Chagrin Falls, OH. His granddaughter is former World Series of Poker champion Annie Duke.

Awards 

In 2013, Craig Spangenberg was inducted into the Trial Lawyer Hall of Fame, managed by Trial Lawyer Magazine.   Spangenberg joins such luminary trial lawyers as Clarence Darrow and Thurgood Marshall, as well as more recent lawyers like Howard Nations and Gerry Spence.

Famous arguments and trial techniques

Eggshell victim argument 

Craig Spangenberg the trial advocate developed the "eggshell victim" argument, which suggested that you must take your victim as you find them, regardless of whether they were more vulnerable or easily injured than "average" people.  The argument went as follows, as recounted by James W. McElhaney in the American Bar Association Journal:

"We come to the subject of damages, and it's a difficult area of decision. Oh, I wish this were a simpler case like a farmer driving his pickup truck on a country road when someone speeds through the stop sign, runs into his truck and turns it over.

"The farmer's not hurt, but his truck is. One side's all dented in, the windshield is broken out and a fender is torn off. And if you as a jury were asked, 'What's fair compensation for what the driver of the car did to the farmer's truck?' you wouldn't have any problem with that.

"You'd give him the kind of truck he had. You wouldn't give him a new truck, because he didn't have one. But he shouldn't have to drive a truck that's all bent up and missing a windshield, because he didn't have that, either. So fair compensation--just compensation--would be to pay him what it would cost to fix the truck he has. And I'm sure that my friend for the defense would accept that.

"Well, now suppose that the plaintiff is a poultry farmer and he has the back of his truck filled with eggs, three-hundred dozen grade A eggs, all carefully boxed and crated. And the defendant speeds through the stop sign, just like he did in this case. As a result you have three-hundred dozen grade A whites and yolks running all over the pavement. "What is fair compensation? Those are his eggs. They were marketable. His property has been taken away. His income has been taken away.

"What is fair compensation? Ninety-six cents a dozen retail?

"No. He wasn't going to sell them retail. He was going to sell them wholesale, and the wholesale price reported in the newspaper was forty-seven cents a dozen. So he's entitled to forty-seven cents times three hundred. One hundred and forty-one dollars. Now, in this situation, wouldn't you think the defense lawyer had taken leave of his senses if he told you, 'Don't you pay him a hundred and forty-one dollars for those eggs! Why, if they'd been golf balls, not one would be broken.'

"I'm not telling you Mike Wilson was an egg, but he was like an egg. He was fragile. But he was still useful and marketable. He was able to sell what strength he had in the marketplace of labor.

"But he certainly was not a golf ball, and when the defendant sped through the stop sign and hit Mike Wilson, he did not bounce.

"And fair compensation is to restore the loss that has actually been inflicted on the actual man or woman. Just like when you break an actual egg, fair compensation is paying the actual value."

References

Ohio lawyers
1914 births
1998 deaths
University of Michigan Law School alumni
20th-century American lawyers
Canadian King's Counsel